Portlethen Academy is a six-year comprehensive secondary school in Portlethen, Aberdeenshire, Scotland.

History

With the expansion of the communities of Portlethen and Newtonhill in the 1980s, the Education Committee of Grampian Regional Council decided to build a new six-year Academy in Portlethen. Until then, pupils from the area were bused to Mackie Academy, in near-by Stonehaven. Portlethen Academy opened on 20 April 1987 as a new school for the communities of Portlethen, Newtonhill, Muchalls and Banchory-Devenick. Originally owned by Grampian Regional Council, the school passed to Aberdeenshire Council, when it formed in 1996.

The school opened with 180 pupils in Years 1 and 2 and a capacity of around 650. It has expanded in numbers each session since April 1987, reaching over 800 pupils. As the roll rose, the school became too small to accommodate all the pupils and staff. Seven temporary classrooms were added to the school prior to closure. The current Headteacher is Barry Drennan.

Aberdeenshire Council commissioned a new school under the PPP Scheme.

Current building
As early as the turn of the millennium, plans existed for a new school, to be built and managed by Robertson FM, as part of the Government's PPP scheme. It was built on the playing fields adjacent to the existing Academy. Construction started in June 2004, and was completed by the end of July 2006. Originally set to open in June 2006, for the start of the new timetable, a burst pipe delayed the school's opening until August. The new building opened on 22 August 2006 with a roll of 867. The old school has been knocked down, and the main car park which forms part of the area along with the all-weather pitch made up stage 2 of the relocation programme.

Footnotes

External links

Secondary schools in Aberdeenshire
Portlethen